Poiana may refer to:

Geography

Italy 
 Pojana Maggiore (Poiana Maggiore), a town in the province of Vicenza, Veneto, Italy
 Villa Pojana, or Poiana, a patrician villa in Pojana Maggiore, a UNESCO World Heritage site

Moldova
Poiana, Șoldănești, a commune in Șoldănești district
Poiana, a village in Hincăuți Commune, Edineț district
Poiana, a village in Boghenii Noi Commune, Ungheni district

Romania

Inhabited places

 Poiana, Dâmbovița, a commune in Dâmbovița County
 Poiana, Galați, a commune in Galați County
Poiana, a village in Bistra, Alba
Poiana, a village in Bucium, Alba
Poiana, a village in Sohodol Commune, Alba County
Poiana, a village in Vârfurile Commune, Arad County
Poiana, a village in Colonești, Bacău
Poiana, a village in Livezi, Bacău
Poiana, a village in Mărgineni, Bacău
Poiana, a village in Motoșeni Commune, Bacău County
Poiana, a village in Negri, Bacău
Poiana, a village in Criștioru de Jos Commune, Bihor County
Poiana, a village in Tăuteu Commune, Bihor County
Poiana, a village in Brăești, Botoșani
Poiana, a village in Flămânzi Town, Botoșani County
Poiana, a village in Cristinești Commune, Botoșani County
Poiana, a village in Vorona, Botoșani
Poiana, a village in Buchin Commune, Caraș-Severin County
Poiana (Poiana de Arieș), a village which became a neighbourhood of Turda, Cluj County
Poiana, a village in Ovidiu Town, Constanța County
Poiana, a village in Turburea Commune, Gorj County
Poiana, a village in Balșa Commune, Hunedoara County
Poiana, a village in Ciulnița Commune, Ialomița County
Poiana, a village in Deleni, Iași
Poiana, a village in Schitu Duca Commune, Iași County
Poiana, a village in Căzănești, Mehedinți
Poiana, a village in Brusturi, Neamț
Poiana, a village in Dulcești Commune, Neamț County
Poiana, a village in Grințieș Commune, Neamț County
Poiana, a village in Negrești, Neamț
Poiana, a village in Pângărați Commune, Neamț County
Poiana, a village in Radomirești Commune, Olt County
Poiana, a village in Comarnic Commune, Prahova County
Poiana, a village in Dolhasca Town, Suceava County
Poiana, a village in Zvoriștea Commune, Suceava County
Poiana, a village in Ciuperceni, Teleorman
Poiana, a village in Negrești Town, Vaslui County
Poiana, a village in Vrâncioaia Commune, Vrancea County
Poiana, a village in Perișani Commune, Vâlcea County
 Poiana Aiudului, a village in Livezile, Alba
 Poiana Ampoiului, a village in Meteș Commune, Alba County
 Poiana Blenchii, a commune in Sălaj County
 Poiana Botizii, a village in Băiuț Commune, Maramureș County
 Poiana Brașov, a ski resort near Brașov
 Poiana Câmpina, a commune in Prahova County
 Poiana Codrului, a village in Crucișor Commune, Satu Mare County
 Poiana Copăceni, a village in Gura Vitioarei Commune, Prahova County
 Poiana Crăcăoani, a village in Crăcăoani Commune, Neamț County
 Poiana Cristei, a commune in Vrancea County
 Poiana cu Cetate, a village in Grajduri Commune, Iași County
 Poiana de Sus, a village in Țibana Commune, Iași County
 Poiana Fagului, a village in Lunca de Jos Commune, Harghita County
 Poiana Fântânii, a village in Argetoaia Commune, Dolj County
 Poiana Frății, a village in Frata Commune, Cluj County
 Poiana Galdei, a village in Galda de Jos Commune, Alba County
 Poiana Gruii, a village in Gruia, Mehedinți
 Poiana Horea, a village in Beliș Commune, Cluj County
 Poiana Humei, a village in Oniceni Commune, Neamț County
 Poiana Lacului, a commune in Argeș County
 Poiana Largului, a village in Poiana Teiului Commune, Neamț County
 Poiana lui Alexa, a village in Pușcași Commune, Vaslui County
 Poiana lui Stângă, a village in Vânătorii Mici Commune, Giurgiu County
 Poiana Lungă, a village in Cornereva Commune, Caraș-Severin County
 Poiana Măgura, a village in Sărmășag Commune, Sălaj County
 Poiana Mănăstirii, a village in Țibana Commune, Iași County
 Poiana Mărului, a village in Zăvoi Commune, Caraș-Severin County
 Poiana Mărului, a village in Ceplenița Commune, Iași County
 Poiana Mărului, a village in Mălini Commune, Suceava County
 Poiana Mare, a commune in Olt County
 Poiana Mare, a village in Bătrâni Commune, Prahova County
 Poiana Mărului, a commune in Brașov County
 Poiana Micului, a village in Mănăstirea Humorului Commune, Suceava County
 Poiana Mierlei, a village in Drajna Commune, Prahova County
 Poiana Negrii, a village in Dorna Candrenilor Commune, Suceava County
 Poiana Negustorului, a village in Blăgești, Bacău
 Poiana Onții, a village in Cristolț Commune, Sălaj County
 Poiana Pietrei, a village in Dragomirești, Vaslui
 Poiana Pletari, a village in Chiliile Commune, Buzău County
 Poiana Răchițelii, a village in Cerbăl Commune, Hunedoara County
 Poiana Sărată, a village in Oituz Commune, Bacău County
 Poiana Șcheii, a village in Șcheia, Iași
 Poiana-Seciuri, a village in Bustuchin Commune, Gorj County
 Poiana Sibiului, a commune in Sibiu County
 Poiana Stampei, a commune in Suceava County
 Poiana Stoichii, a village in Vintileasca Commune, Vrancea County
 Poiana Țapului, a village in Bușteni Town, Prahova County
 Poiana Tășad, a village in Copăcel town, Bihor County
 Poiana Teiului, a commune in Neamț County
 Poiana Trestiei, a village in Cosminele Commune, Prahova County
 Poiana Ursului, a village in Meteș Commune, Alba County
 Poiana Vadului, a commune in Alba County
 Poiana Vâlcului, a village in Mânzălești Commune, Buzău County
 Poiana Vărbilău, a village in Vărbilău Commune, Prahova County
Poieni, Cluj, a commune in Cluj County
Poieni, a village in Blandiana Commune, Alba County
Poieni, a village in Bucium, Alba
Poieni, a village in Vidra, Alba
Poieni, a village in Parincea Commune, Bacău County
Poieni, a village in Roșiori, Bacău
Poieni, a village in Târgu Ocna Town, Bacău County
Poieni, a village in Beriu Commune, Hunedoara County
Poieni, a village in Densuș Commune, Hunedoara County
Poieni, a village in Schitu Duca Commune, Iași County
Poieni, a village in Piatra Șoimului Commune, Neamț County
Poieni, a village in Pietroasa, Timiș
Poieni-Solca, a commune in Suceava County
Poieni-Suceava, a village in Udești Commune, Suceava County

Mountains
 Poiana Ruscă Mountains, a subdivision of the Romanian Carpathians

Rivers

 Poiana, a tributary of the Sohodol in Alba County
 Poiana, a tributary of the Mara in Maramureș County
 Poiana, a tributary of the Prut in Botoșani County
 Poiana, a tributary of the Telcișor in Bistrița-Năsăud County 
 Poiana, a tributary of the Vorona in Botoșani County
 Poiana (Someș), a tributary of the Someș in Maramureș and Sălaj Counties 
 Poiana (Topa), a tributary of the Topa in Bihor County
 Poiana Lungă, a tributary of the Dobrovăț in Iași County
 Poiana Mică, a tributary of the Rudăreasa in Vâlcea County

Ukraine
Poiana, the Romanian name for Polyana, Khotyn Raion
Poieni, the Romanian name for Bukivka Commune, Hertsa Raion
Poieni, the Romanian name for Polyana village, Turyatka Commune, Hlyboka Raion

Other uses
 Poiana (genus), commonly known as oyans or African linsangs, a genus of the mammalian family Viverridae
 African linsang (Poiana richardsonii), a species of linsang
 Leighton's linsang (Poiana leightoni), a former subspecies of the African linsang
 Poiana (brand), a brand of food in Romania owned by Kraft Foods

See also
Poienești, a commune in Vaslui County, Romania
Poienii de Jos and Poienii de Sus, villages in Buntești Commune, Bihor County
Poienile (disambiguation)